Sordale is a small linear village, located  northeast in Halkirk,  in Caithness, Scottish Highlands and is in the Scottish council area of Highland. The small hamlet of Shalmstry can be found to the north of the village.

References

Populated places in Caithness